Friederike Luise Christiane Delitz (1791 – 28 May 1813) was a convicted Prussian arsonist. Alongside her accomplice and co-defendant, Johann Peter Horst, she was the last person in Germany to have been executed by burning.

Delitz had a relationship with Johann Peter Horst (1783–1813), with whom she was arrested after a fire in Schöneberg in 1810. In August 1812, she stood trial for having been a part of a gang of arsonists, consisting of nine arsonists aside from Horst and herself, which were suspected of having caused 45 fires with 30 casualties around Brandenburg. Delitz and Horst were judged guilty and sentenced to be executed by burning. The verdict was carried out in Berlin 28 May 1813.

The cause célèbre has been the subject of research and exhibitions.

References
General
 jrbecker.net: Events in 1813
 museentempelhof-schoeneberg.de: Steckbrieflich gesucht! Die wahre Geschichte einer Mordbrennerbande in Preußen – Eine Ausstellung des Jugend Museums Schöneberg zum Preußenjahr (in German)
 berliner-zeitung.de: Die wahre Geschichte der Mordbrenner (in German)
 tagesspiegel.de: Schöneberg: Brandstifter auf dem Scheiterhaufen (in German)
 welt.de: Das letzte Feuer (in German)

Notes

1791 births
1813 deaths
19th-century executions by Germany
Executed German female serial killers
German arsonists
People executed by Germany by burning
People executed by Prussia